Swedish Volleyball Federation is a special sports association for volleyball in Sweden. It was established on 3 June 1961 and was appointed into the Swedish Sports Confederation in 1961. It is based in Solna.

It represents Sweden with national teams like the Sweden men's national volleyball team and the Sweden women's national volleyball team.

References

External links
Official website 

1961 establishments in Sweden
Sports organizations established in 1961
Volleyball
Volleyball in Sweden
Sweden